Audrey Barcio (born 1978) is an American interdisciplinary visual artist. She is based in Chicago, IL. Barcio is an Assistant Professor of Art at Ball State University in Muncie, Indiana.

Education and early life 
Barcio was born in Lafayette, Indiana. Her grandmother was a painter. She taught Barcio how to paint and had her mix her paints for her when she went blind. Barcio is a former flight attendant and sommelier. Barcio earned a Bachelor of Arts from Herron School of Art and Design in Indianapolis, a Master of Fine Arts from the University of Nevada, Las Vegas. She attended the Pont-Aven School of Contemporary Art in Brittany, France and was awarded a residency at the Vermont Studio Center.

Exhibitions 
 Streetlight, Roman Susan, Chicago, IL
 Urban Legends, Columbia College Chicago Library, Chicago, IL
 Sapientia Gloria Corona Est, New Harmony Contemporary, New Harmony, Indiana
 Human Contact, Marjorie Barrick Museum of Art, Las Vegas, NV
 Plural, Marjorie Barrick Museum of Art, Las Vegas, NV
 Under Influence, Tube Factory Artspace, Indianapolis, IN
 Masking, Marjorie Barrick Museum of Art, Las Vegas, NV
 Space Between, Donna Beam Gallery, UNLV, Las Vegas, NV
 Marking Time, Random Access, Syracuse University, Syracuse, NY
 Art in America at the Art Miami Satellite Fair
 2014 Life Is Beautiful Music & Art Festival

Public Installations 
 Continual Eventual, Clark County Government Center Rotunda, Las Vegas Nevada
 The Art Motel, Life Is Beautiful Music & Art Festival
 Departure, Indianapolis, IN
 Strata (with Rebecca Pugh), Las Vegas City Hall

Awards 
 2019 Pollock-Krasner Foundation Award
 2017 Vermont Studio Center Residency
 2014 City of Las Vegas Certificate of Public Art
 2007 Indianapolis Cultural Development Public Art Grant

Publications 
Barcio's work has been featured in New American Paintings, Las Vegas Weekly, NUVO (newspaper), Las Vegas Review-Journal, OCCHI Magazine, Pattern Magazine, Create Magazine, and on the Round Table radio show.

References 

American artists
1978 births
Living people